The 1948 Pittsburgh Steelers season was the franchise's 16th season in the National Football League (NFL). The team finished the season with a record of 4–8, failing to qualify for the playoffs. This season marked the first played with John Michelosen as head coach.

Regular season

Schedule

Game summaries

Week 2 (Sunday September 26, 1948): Washington Redskins 

at Griffith Stadium, Washington, DC

 Game time: 
 Game weather: 
 Game attendance: 32,084
 Referee: 
 TV announcers:

Scoring drives:

 Washington – Castiglia 22 pass from Baugh (Poillon kick)
 Pittsburgh – Clement 28 run (Glamp kick)
 Pittsburgh – Glamp 38 pass from Clement (Glamp kick)
 Washington – Turley 33 fumble run (Poillon kick)
 Washington – FG Poillon 28

Week 3 (Monday October 3, 1948): Boston Yanks  

at Forbes Field, Pittsburgh, Pennsylvania

 Game time: 
 Game weather: 
 Game attendance: 26,216
 Referee: 
 TV announcers:

Scoring drives:

 Boston – Paschal 15 pass from Youel (Zimmerman kick)
 Boston – Pritko 33 fumble run (Zimmerman kick)
 Pittsburgh – Nickel 24 pass from Clement (Glamp kick)
 Pittsburgh – FG Glamp 35
 Pittsburgh – Seabright 7 pass from Clement (Glamp kick)
 Pittsburgh – Mosley 3 run (Glamp kick)

Week 4 (Sunday October 10, 1948): Washington Redskins  

at Forbes Field, Pittsburgh, Pennsylvania

 Game time: 
 Game weather: 
 Game attendance: 28,969
 Referee: 
 TV announcers:

Scoring drives:

 Pittsburgh – Clement 3 run (Glamp kick)
 Washington – Crisler 19 pass from Baugh (Poillon kick)
 Pittsburgh – FG Glamp 13

Week 5 (Sunday October 17, 1948): Boston Yanks  

at Fenway Park, Boston, Massachusetts

 Game time: 
 Game weather: 
 Game attendance: 7,208
 Referee: 
 TV announcers:

Scoring drives:

 Boston – Heywood 14 fumble run (kick failed)
 Boston – Seno 22 pass from Zimmerman (Zimmerman kick)
 Pittsburgh – Shipkey 1 run (Glamp kick)

Week 6 (Sunday October 24, 1948): New York Giants  

at Polo Grounds, New York, New York

 Game time: 
 Game weather: 
 Game attendance: 13,443
 Referee: 
 TV announcers:

Scoring drives:

 New York – Sultatis 2 run (Williams kick)
 Pittsburgh – Shipkey 1 run (kick failed)
 New York – White 54 lateral from Cheverko after 35 kick return (kick failed)
 New York – Roberts 49 pass from Conerly (Williams kick)
 Pittsburgh – Jansante 12 pass from Evans (Glamp kick)
 Pittsburgh – Jansante 66 pass from Evans (Glamp kick)
 New York – Sulaitis 34 pass from Conerly (Williams kick)
 New York – Conerly 1 run (Williams kick)

Week 7 (Sunday October 31, 1948): Philadelphia Eagles  

at Forbes Field, Pittsburgh, Pennsylvania

 Game time: 
 Game weather: 
 Game attendance: 32,474
 Referee: 
 TV announcers:

Scoring Drives:

 Philadelphia – FG Patton 42
 Pittsburgh – Shipkey 1 run (Glamp kick)
 Philadelphia – Van Buren 20 run (Patton kick)
 Philadelphia – Ferrante 7 pass from Thompson (Patton kick)
 Philadelphia – Pritchard 55 punt return (Patton kick)
 Philadelphia – FG Patton 23
 Philadelphia – Pritchard 18 fumble run (Patton kick)

Week 8 (Sunday November 7, 1948): Green Bay Packers  

at Forbes Field, Pittsburgh, Pennsylvania

 Game time: 
 Game weather: 
 Game attendance: 26,058
 Referee: 
 TV announcers:

Scoring drives:

 Pittsburgh – Jansante 7 pass from Evans (Glamp kick)
 Pittsburgh – FG Glamp 33
 Pittsburgh – Shipkey 1 run (Glamp kick)
 Pittsburgh – Evans 14 run (Glamp kick)
 Pittsburgh – Glamp 55 run (Glamp kick)
 Pittsburgh – Compagno 82 interception (Glamp kick)
 Green Bay – Goodnight 19 pass from Girard (Fritsch kick)

Week 9 (Sunday November 14, 1948): Chicago Cardinals  

at Forbes Field, Pittsburgh, Pennsylvania

 Game time: 
 Game weather: 
 Game attendance: 33,364
 Referee: 
 TV announcers:

Scoring drives:

 Chicago Cardinals – Kutner 42 pass from Mallouf (Harder kick)
 Chicago Cardinals – Trippi 67 punt return (Harder kick)
 Pittsburgh – Shipkey 67 punt return (Glamp kick)
 Chicago Cardinals – Harder 8 run (Harder kick)
 Chicago Cardinals – FG Yablonski 41

Week 10 (Sunday November 21, 1948): Detroit Lions  

at Briggs Stadium, Detroit, Michigan

 Game time: 
 Game weather: 
 Game attendance: 16,189
 Referee: 
 TV announcers:

Scoring drives:

 Pittsburgh – Shipkey 1 run (Glamp kick)
 Detroit – Dudley 19 pass from Enke (Pregulman kick)
 Detroit – FG Pregulman 33
 Detroit – Dudley 28 fumble run (Pregulman kick)
 Pittsburgh – Papach 2 run (Glamp kick)

Week 11 (Sunday November 28, 1948): Philadelphia Eagles  

at Shibe Park, Philadelphia, Pennsylvania

 Game time: 
 Game weather: 
 Game attendance: 22,001
 Referee: 
 TV announcers:

Scoring drives:

 Philadelphia – Pritchard 5 run (Patton kick)
 Philadelphia – Pihos 13 pass from Thompson (Patton kick)
 Philadelphia – FG Patton 31

Week 12 (Sunday December 5, 1948): New York Giants  

at Forbes Field, Pittsburgh, Pennsylvania

 Game time: 
 Game weather: 
 Game attendance: 27,645
 Referee: 
 TV announcers:

Scoring drives:

 Pittsburgh – Evans 9 run (Glamp kick)
 New York – Minisi 6 run (Younce kick)
 Pittsburgh – FG Glamp 40
 Pittsburgh – Glamp 3 pass from Evans (Glamp kick)
 New York – Roberts 18 pass from Conerly (Younce kick)
 Pittsburgh – Shipkey 2 run (Glamp kick)
 Pittsburgh – Cifers 2 run (Glamp kick)
 Pittsburgh – Morales 36 fumble run (Glamp kick)
 New York – Johnson 11 pass from Conerly (Younce kick)
 New York – Swiacki 11 pass from Conerly (Younce kick)

Week 13 (Sunday December 12, 1948): Los Angeles Rams  

at Los Angeles Memorial Coliseum, Los Angeles, California

 Game time: 
 Game weather: 
 Game attendance: 27,967
 Referee: 
 TV announcers:

Scoring drives:

 Los Angeles – Hickey 21 pass from Hardy (Waterfield kick)
 Los Angeles – Hubbell 8 pass from Hardy (Waterfield kick)
 Pittsburgh – Papach 1 run (Glamp kick)
 Los Angeles – Fears 29 pass from Waterfield (Waterfield kick)
 Los Angeles – FG Waterfield 47
 Los Angeles – Magnani 16 pass from Hardy (Gehrke kick)
 Pittsburgh – Papach 28 pass from Evans (Glamp kick)

Standings

References

Pittsburgh Steelers seasons
Pittsburgh Steelers
Pitts